The 1918 Calgary municipal election was held on December 9, 1918 to a Mayor and six Aldermen to sit on Calgary City Council. Additionally a Commissioner, three members for the Public School Board were elected.

There were twelve aldermen on city council, but five of the positions were already filled: Samuel Hunter Adams, Andrew Graham Broatch, Frank Roy Freeze, Annie Gale, and Albert Mahaffy were all elected to two-year terms in 1917 and were still in office. Robert Colin Marshall was elected as an Alderman in 1917 for a two-year term, but resigned to run for mayor.

A number of plebiscites were held, all requiring a majority to pass.

The election was held under the Single Transferable Voting/Proportional Representation (STV/PR) with the term for Alderman being two years and the Mayor being one year. The Alderman seat vacated by Marshall would be held by the 7th-place finisher in the election for a period of one year.

Background
The election would take place during the 1918 influenza pandemic which was first reported in Calgary two months before the election on October 3, 1918 by 15 soldiers returning to Canada from the First World War. By November 30, 1918, the pandemic had effected almost every Alberta community with more than 26,000 cases.

The Calgary Daily Herald would also set a "brilliant colored" flare above the Herald Building to announce the elected mayor, red should Marshall win and yellow should Costello be elected.

This would be the second municipal election held with the proportional vote system in Calgary, and there was an expectation there would be several invalid ballots due to electors marking preference with an "x" rather than numerically by preference. However, there would be far fewer spoiled ballots in the 1918 election then the 1917 election. Following the election the editors of the Calgary Daily Herald would comment on "carelessness" in the preparation of voters' lists which left many people without the ability to vote, stating "An inaccurate voters' list is almost worse than none at all".

Results

Mayor

Council

Commissioner

Public School Board
Quota necessary for election was 1,512.

Hospital Board
The quota was 544 votes.

See also
List of Calgary municipal elections

References

Sources
Frederick Hunter: THE MAYORS AND COUNCILS  OF  THE CORPORATION OF CALGARY Archived March 3, 2020

Politics of Calgary
Municipal elections in Calgary
1918 elections in Canada
1910s in Calgary